Chaga (published as Evolution's Shore in the United States) is a 1995 science fiction novel by British author Ian McDonald. It was released in the United Kingdom on 12 October 1995. Told through the eyes of journalist Gaby McAslan, the novel explores the catastrophic effects of an alien flora, dubbed the "Chaga", which is brought to Kenya by a meteor in what has become known as the Kilimanjaro Event.

McDonald said of the novel:

Chaga was nominated for the British Science Fiction Association Award for Best Novel (1995), and the John W. Campbell Memorial Award for Best Science Fiction Novel (1996).

References

1995 British novels
1995 science fiction novels
British science fiction novels
Novels by Ian McDonald
Victor Gollancz Ltd books
Bantam Spectra books